Annarita is a given name. Notable people with the given name include:
 Annarita Balzani (born 1967), Italian sprinter
 Annarita Sidoti (1969–2015), Italian race walker
  (1951–1999), Italian historian

See also 
 Anna Rita Angotzi (born 1967), Italian former sprinter